Tetrasiphon is a monotypic genus of flowering plants in the family Celastraceae containing the single species Tetrasiphon jamaicensis. It is endemic to Jamaica.

References

Celastraceae
Celastrales genera
Endangered plants
Endemic flora of Jamaica
Monotypic rosid genera
Taxonomy articles created by Polbot